Peace on Earth is the seventeenth studio album by American singer Peabo Bryson. It was released by Angel Records on November 4, 1997 in the United States. Produced by Canadian musician Robbie Buchanan, it marked Bryson's first Christmas album. The standard edition of Peace on Earth consists of ten tracks, featuring the original song "Born on Christmas Day" and nine cover versions of Christmas standards and carols, two of which are duets featuring recording artists Sandi Patti and Roberta Flack. Upon release, Peace on Earth failed to chart, though Christmas with You, a 2005 reissue, released by Time Life, peaked at number 10 on the US Top Holiday Albums chart in 2006.

Critical reception

AllMusic editor Jason Ankeny rated the album three stars out of five.

Track listing 
All tracks were produced and arranged by Robbie Buchanan; except "My Gift Is You," produced Hibiki Hanasaka and co-produced by Tom Keane.

Personnel and credits 
Musicians

 Peabo Bryson – lead vocals 
 Robbie Buchanan – keyboards, Hammond organ, bass, drum programming 
 James Harrah – guitars 
 Mike Baird – drums 
 Steve Tavaglione – saxophones, flute 
 Tommy Morgan – harmonica
 Warren Stayner – backing vocals 
 Sandi Patty – lead vocals (4)
 Roberta Flack – lead vocals (8)
 Wendy Moten – lead vocals (12)

Production

 Jay Landers – executive producer (1-7, 9, 10)
 Bambi Moé – executive producer (8)
 John Bolt – recording
 Bill Buckingham – recording 
 Jeremy Smith – recording, mixing
 Sheldon Zaharko – mixing 
 Koji Egawa – assistant engineer
 Scott Erickson – assistant engineer, production coordinator 
 Doug Sax – mastering 
 Nancy Roof – production coordinator 
 J.C. Suares – art direction, design, photography 

Studios

 Recorded at The Hop (Sherman Oaks, CA); Bill Schnee Studios (North Hollywood, CA); Capitol Studios (Hollywood, CA); Aire Born Studios (Zionsville, IN).
 Mixed at Bill Schnee Studios; The Factory Studios (Vancouver, BC, Canada).
 Mastered at The Mastering Lab (Hollywood, CA).

Charts

Release history

References 

1997 Christmas albums
Peabo Bryson albums
Christmas albums by American artists
Rhythm and blues Christmas albums